The  of 1918–1922 was the dispatch of Japanese military forces to the Russian Maritime Provinces as part of a larger effort by western powers and Japan to support White Russian forces against the Bolshevik Red Army during the Russian Civil War. The Japanese suffered 1,399 killed and another 1,717 deaths from disease. World War I: A Student Encyclopedia. p.969. Japanese military forces occupied Russian cities and towns in the province of Primorsky Krai from 1918 to 1922.

Background

On August 23, 1914, the Empire of Japan declared war on Germany, in part due to the Anglo-Japanese Alliance, and Japan became a member of the Entente powers. The Imperial Japanese Navy made a considerable contribution to the Allied war effort; however, the Imperial Japanese Army was more sympathetic to Germany, and aside from the seizure of Tsingtao, resisted attempts to become involved in combat. The overthrow of Tsar Nicholas II and the establishment of a Bolshevik government in Russia led to a separate peace with Germany and the collapse of the Eastern Front. The spread of the anti-monarchist Bolshevik revolution eastward was of great concern to the Japanese government. Vladivostok, facing the Sea of Japan was a major port, with a massive stockpile of military stores, and a large foreign merchant community.

Japanese participation
The Japanese were initially asked by the French in 1917 to intervene in Russia but declined. However, in February 1918, a "Siberia Planning Committee" was formed by the Imperial Japanese Army General Staff and the Army Ministry with the aim of exploring the possibility that the Tsarist collapse was an opportunity to free Japan from any future threat from Russia by detaching Siberia and forming an independent buffer state. The Army proposed attacking on two fronts, from Vladivostok to Khabarovsk along the Amur River and also via the Chinese Eastern Railway to cut off the Russian Trans-Siberian Railway at Lake Baikal. The Japanese government, then under the civilian leadership of Prime Minister Hara Takashi rejected the plan.

In late 1917, the Japanese government was alarmed to find that the British government, despite the Anglo-Japanese Alliance, had approached the United States about a possible joint intervention at Vladivostok, without consulting Japan. In December 1917, the British agreed that such a force should include Japan, but before the details could be worked out, the British ordered  from Hong Kong to Vladivostok. Japanese Prime Minister Terauchi Masatake was outraged and ordered the Imperial Japanese Navy to reach Vladivostok first. With crews working day-and-night over the new year holidays, Iwami was able to depart from Kure Naval District on January 9, 1918, and arrived at Vladivostok on January 12, only two days before HMS Suffolk. Asahi arrived on January 17, and became Katō's flagship. , which had been stationed at Vladivostok until December 1917, returned on March 1.

It was the original intent that this show of force by Allied warships would enhance the confidence of the local anti-Bolshevik forces and help restore public order; however, this proved to be overly optimistic. After an armed mob looted a Japanese-owned store, killing its owner, the Japanese government, without waiting for an investigation of the murder, permitted the landing of marines, who proceeded to occupy the entire city. The British also landed 100 Royal Marines to protect their consulate, but the Americans took no action. In July 1918, President Wilson asked the Japanese government to supply 7,000 troops as part of an international coalition of 25,000 troops, including an American expeditionary force, planned to support the rescue of the Czechoslovak Legion and securing of wartime supplies stockpiled at Vladivostok. After heated debate in the Diet, the administration of Prime Minister Terauchi agreed to send 12,000 troops, but under the command of Japan, rather than as part of an international coalition.

Once the political decision had been reached, the Imperial Japanese Army took over full control under Chief of Staff Yui Mitsue and extensive planning for the expedition was conducted. The Japanese eventually deployed 70,000 troops under the command of General Kikuzo Otani – far more than any of the other Allied powers had anticipated. Furthermore, although the Allies had envisioned operations only in the vicinity of Vladivostok, within months Japanese forces had penetrated as far west as Lake Baikal and Buryatia, and by 1920, zaibatsu such as Mitsubishi, Mitsui and others had opened offices in Vladivostok, Khabarovsk, Nikolayevsk-on-Amur and Chita, bringing with them over 50,000 civilian settlers. After the international coalition withdrew its forces, the Japanese Army stayed on. However, political opposition prevented the Army from annexing the resource-rich region. Japan continued to support White Movement leader Admiral Aleksandr Kolchak until his defeat and capture in 1920, and also supported the regime of Ataman Semenov, who they intended to take control under the planned buffer state but whose unstable government collapsed by 1922. In March and April 1922, the Japanese Army repulsed large Bolshevik offensives against Vladivostok. On June 24, 1922, Japan announced that it would unilaterally withdraw from all of Russian territory by October, with the exception of northern Sakhalin island, which had been seized in retaliation for the Nikolayevsk incident of 1920. The last Japanese soldiers left Vladivostok on October 25 1922. On January 20, 1925, the Soviet–Japanese Basic Convention was signed in Beijing. Following this convention, Japan undertook to withdraw their troops from northern Sakhalin by May 15, 1925.

Effects on Japanese politics
Japan's motives in the Siberian Intervention were complex and poorly articulated. Overtly, Japan (as with the United States and the other international coalition forces) was in Siberia to safeguard stockpiled military supplies and to rescue the Czechoslovak Legion. However, the Japanese government's antipathy to communism and socialism, a determination to recoup historical losses to Russia, and the perceived opportunity to settle the "northern problem" to Japan's advantage by either creating a buffer state or through outright territorial acquisition were also factors. However, patronage of various White Movement leaders left Japan in a poor diplomatic position vis-à-vis the government of the Soviet Union, after the Red Army eventually emerged victorious from the Russian Civil War. The intervention tore Japan's wartime unity to shreds, leading to the army and government being involved in bitter controversy and renewed faction strife in the army itself. The official conduct of the Siberian Intervention was later bitterly attacked in the Japanese Diet, with the Army being accused of grossly misrepresenting the size of the forces sent, misappropriating secret funds, and supporting figures such as lieutenant general Roman von Ungern-Sternberg, rumors of whose atrocities had reached the press.

Japanese casualties from the Siberian Expedition included some 5,000 dead from combat or illness, and the expenses incurred were in excess of ¥900 million.

Citations

References
 - Total pages: 304

Allied intervention in the Russian Civil War
Empire of Japan
Wars involving Japan
Wars involving the Soviet Union
Japan–Soviet Union relations
20th century in Japan
Foreign intervention
Invasions of Russia
History of the Russian Far East
History of Northeast Asia
White movement